Princess Victoria of Hesse-Rotenburg (Anna Victoria Maria Christina; 25 February 1728 – 1 July 1792) was a princess of Hesse by birth, and the Princess of Soubise by marriage. Her husband was a renowned French commander, known as the Maréchal de Soubise. She died without descendants.

Early life
Born in Rotenburg an der Fulda to Joseph, Hereditary Prince of Hesse-Rotenburg and his wife Princess Christine Anna Luise Oswaldine of Salm, she was the eldest of four children.

Marriage
She married Charles de Rohan, prince de Soubise on 23 December 1745 at the château des Rohan in Saverne. He was head of the cadet branch of the wealthy and powerful House of Rohan, which, enjoyed the rank of princes étrangers at the court of Versailles.

Later life
Her husband was a two-time widower, having been married first to Anne Marie Louise de La Tour d'Auvergne (1722–1739), and secondly to Princess Anne Thérese of Savoy-Carignan  (1717–1745). Victoire had two step-daughters from these marriages; Charlotte, future Princess of Condé and Madame de Guéméné, who became governess of the children of Louis XVI.

Among her first cousins were King Victor Amadeus III of Sardinia and the tragic princesse de Lamballe.

Like her husband, she took lovers outside her marriage. In 1757, by order of Louis XV, she was arrested in Tournai, purportedly for having stolen 900,000 livres worth of jewels from her husband in order to run away with her apparent lover, Monsieur de Laval-Montmorency.

The couple separated and her parents were given a pension of 24,000 livres to take Victoire, exiled from court, to dwell with them at Echternach. The couple had no children and Victoire died in Paris, having outlived her husband by five years to the day.

Ancestry

References and notes

1728 births
1792 deaths
People from Rotenburg an der Fulda
House of Hesse-Kassel
House of Rohan
Princesses of Soubise
Duchesses of Rohan-Rohan
Princesses of Epinoy
Duchesses of Joyeuse
Landgravines of Hesse-Rotenburg
18th-century German people